Harmen Kuperus (born 2 June 1977) is a Dutch professional retired footballer who played as a goalkeeper and was active as a goalkeeping coach at Mechelen playing the Belgian First Division B until May 7, 2019.

Kuperus was employed by various Dutch teams, including Willem II, Zwolle, Heerenveen, Volendam and Telstar. During his career he was often employed as backup goalkeeper, therefore only playing very few official matches.

References

External links
 

1977 births
Living people
Dutch footballers
SC Telstar players
PEC Zwolle players
SC Heerenveen players
FC Volendam players
Willem II (football club) players
Eerste Divisie players
Footballers from Friesland
People from Sneek
Association football goalkeepers
Oud-Heverlee Leuven non-playing staff
Dutch football managers
ONS Sneek players
SC Heerenveen non-playing staff